Hospozín is a municipality and village in Kladno District in the Central Bohemian Region of the Czech Republic. It has about 600 inhabitants.

Administrative parts
The village of Hospozínek is an administrative part of Hospozín.

References

Villages in Kladno District